First Baptist Church is a historic church at 246 S. Main Street in Darlington, South Carolina. It was built in 1912 and added to the National Register of Historic Places in 1991.

References

Baptist churches in South Carolina
Churches on the National Register of Historic Places in South Carolina
Colonial Revival architecture in South Carolina
Churches completed in 1912
20th-century Baptist churches in the United States
Churches in Darlington County, South Carolina
National Register of Historic Places in Darlington County, South Carolina
Darlington, South Carolina
1912 establishments in South Carolina